1-2-3-4 is a photography book published by Dutch photographer Anton Corbijn in 2015. The book has a foreword by the artist himself. The book of music photography documents his vast career as a photographer of some of the leading contemporary musicians and rock bands, since the late 1970s, in a selection of 350 photographs, including many never published before.

Artists and bands documented
The bands and musicians documented include Depeche Mode, U2, The Rolling Stones, Metallica, Nirvana, Arcade Fire, Joe Cocker, Johnny Rotten, Nick Cave, and Tom Waits.

Many of the musicians also wrote their contributions to document their work with Anton Corbijn.

About
The book theme was also the subject of the exhibition "Anton Corbijn 1-2-3-4", that took place at the Fotomuseum Den Haag in 2015.

The oversized book pays tribute to Corbijn's longtime interest and work related with rock and roll. Looking back over four decades, it features hundreds of creative, offbeat images that Corbijn was able to capture largely as a result of his close relationships with his subjects. Also included there are previously unpublished photos of the late Joe Cocker and the band Depeche Mode.

References

2015 non-fiction books
Books by Anton Corbijn
Dutch non-fiction books
Books about musicians
Prestel Publishing books